"Inuyasha" is a song by Italian singer Mahmood. It was released as a digital download and for streaming on 2 February 2021 by Island Records. The song peaked at number twenty-one on the Italian Singles Chart. The song was written by Alessandro Mahmoud and Dardust, and produced by Dardust.

Critical reception
Jonathan Vautrey of Wiwibloggs wrote, "Mahmood has never made secret his love for things such as Pokémon and anime. And now, the Italian star is bringing that into his music. His new single is titled “Inuyasha”, which is the name of a manga/anime series centred around a half-dog demon, half-human character called Inuyasha. The Eurovision 2019 runner-up dresses as his own version of Inuyasha, with a bit of Italian fashion flair. Sonically, the track is a strong mid-tempo hip-hop offering that Mahmood takes further with his passion and charisma."

Music video
A music video to accompany the release of "Inuyasha" was first released onto YouTube on 5 February 2021. The video was directed by Simone Rovellini.

Personnel
Credits adapted from Tidal.
 Dardust – producer and composer
 Mahmood – associated performer, author, vocals

Charts

Certifications

References

2021 singles
2021 songs
Island Records singles
Mahmood (singer) songs
Songs written by Dario Faini
Songs written by Mahmood